Ceann na Creige is a Scottish Gaelic placename. It can refer to:

 Kennacraig, a hamlet on the Kintyre peninsula
 Eilean Ceann na Creige, a small island near Kennacraig
 Kincraig, a village between Kingussie and Aviemore